Benjamín Prades Reverte (born October 26, 1983 in Socuéllamos) is a Spanish cyclist, who currently rides for UCI Continental team . His brother Eduard Prades is also a professional cyclist.

Major results

2011
 6th Overall Cinturó de l'Empordà
2013
 1st Stage 1 Tour of Galicia
2014
 9th Overall Tour of Japan
 9th Tour de Okinawa
2015
 1st Overall Tour de Kumano
1st Stage 2
 1st Stage 3 Tour of Japan
 2nd Overall Tour de Ijen
1st Points classification
1st Stage 2
 3rd Tour de Okinawa
 6th Overall Tour de Hokkaido
 8th Japan Cup
2016
 2nd Overall Tour de Flores
1st Points classification
1st Stage 5
 2nd Overall Tour de Kumano
 4th Tour de Okinawa
 5th Overall Tour de Ijen
1st Stage 2
 7th Japan Cup
 8th Overall Tour de Taiwan
 8th Overall Tour de Hokkaido
2017
 1st Overall Tour de Taiwan
1st Mountains classification
 2nd Overall Tour of Hainan
 2nd Overall Tour de Lombok
 2nd Prueba Villafranca de Ordizia
 2nd Japan Cup
 10th Overall Tour of China I
 10th Circuito de Getxo
2018
 3rd Overall Tour de Kumano
 5th Oita Urban Classic
 6th Overall Tour of Hainan
 7th Overall Tour of Japan
 8th Overall Tour de Tochigi
2019
 2nd Overall Tour of Japan
 3rd Tour de Okinawa
 5th Road race, National Road Championships
 5th Overall Tour de Ijen
 7th Overall Tour de Kumano
 8th Overall Tour de Korea
2021
 9th Overall Tour de Guadeloupe
2022
 1st Tour de Okinawa

References

External links

1983 births
Living people
Spanish male cyclists
People from Montsià
Sportspeople from the Province of Tarragona
Cyclists from Catalonia
21st-century Spanish people